Chromodoris perola is a species of colourful sea slug, a dorid nudibranch, a marine gastropod mollusk in the family Chromodorididae.

Distribution 
This species was described from Colombia.

Description 
Chromodoris perola will probably be transferred to Felimida if it can be rediscovered. The maximum recorded body length is 11 mm.

Habitat 
Minimum recorded depth is 0.2 m. Maximum recorded depth is 3 m.

References

Chromodorididae
Gastropods described in 1976
Taxa named by Eveline Du Bois-Reymond Marcus